Nothing but Love is the debut studio album by Canadian country music group The Wilkinsons. It was released on August 11, 1998. The album won the 1999 Canadian Country Music Association award for Album of the Year.

Critical reception
Nothing but Love received two and a half stars out of five from AllMusic, which called it "a terrific debut which banishes any concern that the Wilkinsons are simply a novelty act." The review stated that "The trio's vocals blend perfectly and Amanda, who sings most of the leads, has an outstanding voice." Rick Teverbaugh of Country Standard Time gave the album a favourable review, writing that "the end result is more pleasing than hokey, more honest than fabrication and more touching than cutesy." He added that "Steve Wilkinson is the writer and hits the mark more often than not" and "Amanda is clear-voiced and aided by the fact that she doesn't try too hard either to convince anyone she has lived through these songs or that she is capable of sounding older than her years."

Matt Bjorke of about.com gave the album four stars out of five, stating that "The Wilkinsons were instantly noted for their crystal clear harmonic vocals" and "if you like a group that sounds exquisite together, then you should check out The Wilkinsons' debut album." People picked the album as its Album of the Week for September 28, 1998, saying that The Wilkinsons "generate tight harmonies without sacrificing a lively sense of rhythm." Its review went on to say "all three Wilkinsons get to shine with lead vocals at some point here" and "good taste keeps the music unsullied and fun."

Singles
Nothing but Love produced The Wilkinsons' first chart singles in "26 Cents" and "Fly (The Angel Song)", which respectively reached number 3 and number 15 on the Billboard Hot Country Songs chart. Both songs were number 1 country hits on the RPM Country Tracks chart in Canada. "Boy Oh Boy" was also released in both countries, reaching number 3 in Canada and number 50 in the U.S., while the U.S.-only "The Yodelin' Blues" reached number 45. Finishing off the single releases was the Canada-only "Nothing but Love (Standing in the Way)" at number 12.

Track listing

Personnel

The Wilkinsons
Amanda Wilkinson – vocals
Steve Wilkinson – vocals
Tyler Wilkinson – vocals

Musicians
Joe Chemay – bass guitar
Shannon Forrest – drums, percussion
Sonny Garrish – steel guitar, dobro
Tony Harrell – keyboards
Tony Haselden – acoustic guitar
John Hobbs – keyboards
Tom Roady – drums, percussion
Brent Rowan – electric guitar
Will Smith – autoharp
Biff Watson – acoustic guitar
John Willis – acoustic guitar

Charts and certifications

Weekly charts

Year-end charts

Singles

Certifications

References

The Wilkinsons albums
1998 debut albums
Giant Records (Warner) albums
Albums produced by Doug Johnson (record producer)
Canadian Country Music Association Album of the Year albums